Tuna is a masculine Altaian given name. It means  fertile, majestic, flamboyant and young in Oyrot. It is also a unisex Turkish given name and surname that comes from the same root. It was used for Danube River in Ottoman times.

Given name
 Tuna Aktürk, Turkish civil engineer
 Tuna Kiremitci, Turkish writer
 Tuna Üzümcü, Turkish footballer
 Tuna Scanlan, Samoan/New Zealand boxer of the 1950s and '60s

Surname
 Mustafa Tuna (born 1957), Turkish environmental engineer, politician and former mayor of Ankara
 Tamer Tuna (footballer, born 1976), Turkish football player and coach
 Tamer Tuna (footballer, born 1991), Turkish football player

Stage name and other names
 Tuna (singer), Albanian singer-songwriter
 Tuna (rapper), Israeli rapper

See also
 "The Big Tuna", nickname of several people
Tona (name)

Turkish-language surnames
Turkish masculine given names